The Atari 7800 is a 8-bit home video game console developed by Atari Corporation and designed by General Computer Corporation, released in North America first on May 1986. It was the third programmable console developed under the Atari brand. The following list contains all of the games released for the 7800. Also listed are the unlicensed aftermarket (homebrew) and unreleased (cancelled) titles.

First test marketed by Atari, Inc. in southern California in June 1984 following an announcement at that year's SCES, the 7800 was designed to replace the unsuccessful Atari 5200 and re-establish Atari's market supremacy against Nintendo and Sega, being fully backward-compatible with the Atari 2600 and affordably priced at US$140. However, 7800 systems manufactured during original production run languished on warehouse shelves until its re-introduction in May 1986 at $79.95, after additional negotiations with GCC concluded and selling 100,000 consoles in North America by the end of 1986, less than its competitors (Nintendo Entertainment System and Master System).  The platform was ultimately discontinued by Atari on January 1, 1992, and it is unknown how many 7800 units were sold in total during its lifetime.



Commercially released games 
Listed here are all  officially released Atari 7800 games.

{|class="wikitable sortable" id="softwarelist" width="auto"
! rowspan="2" | Title
! rowspan="2" | Genre(s)
! rowspan="2" | Developer(s)
! rowspan="2" | Publisher(s)
! rowspan="2" | Release date(s)
! rowspan="2" | Region(s) released
|-

|-
! id="0-9" style="text-align: left;"| 32 in 1
| Compilation
| Atari Corporation
| Atari Corporation
| 1988
| PAL
|-
! id="A" style="text-align: left;"| Ace of Aces
| Combat flight simulation
| Nova Game Design
| Atari Corporation
| 1988
| NA, PAL
|-
! style="text-align: left;"| Alien Brigade
| Shooting gallery
| Sculptured Software
| Atari Corporation
| 1990
| NA, PAL
|-
! style="text-align: left;"| Asteroids
| Shooter
| Atari Corporation
| Atari Corporation
| 1987
| NA, PAL
|-
! id="B" style="text-align: left;"| Ballblazer
| Sports
| General Computer Corporation
| Atari Corporation
| March 1988
| NA, PAL
|-
! style="text-align: left;"| Barnyard Blaster
| Light gun shooter
| Atari Corporation
| Atari Corporation
| 1988
| NA, PAL
|-
! style="text-align: left;"| Basketbrawl
| Sports
| BlueSky Software
| Atari Corporation
| 1990
| NA, PAL
|-
! id="C" style="text-align: left;"| Centipede
| Shooter
| Atari Corporation
| Atari Corporation
| 1987
| NA, PAL
|-
! style="text-align: left;"| Choplifter
| Shooter
| Ibid Inc. Software
| Atari Corporation
| 1987
| NA, PAL
|-
! style="text-align: left;"| Commando
| Run and gun
| Sculptured Software
| Atari Corporation
| 1989
| NA, PAL
|-
! style="text-align: left;"| Crack'ed
| Shooting gallery
| Atari Corporation
| Atari Corporation
| 1988
| NA, PAL
|-
! style="text-align: left;"| Crossbow
| Light gun shooter
| Imagineering
| Atari Corporation
| 1988
| NA, PAL
|-
! id="D" style="text-align: left;"| Dark Chambers
| Dungeon crawl
| Sculptured Software
| Atari Corporation
| 1988
| NA, PAL
|-
! style="text-align: left;"| Desert Falcon
| Scrolling shooter
| General Computer Corporation
| Atari Corporation
| 1987
| NA, PAL
|-
! style="text-align: left;"| Dig Dug
| Maze
| General Computer Corporation
| Atari Corporation
| 1986
| NA, PAL
|-
! style="text-align: left;"| Donkey Kong
| Platform
| International Technology Development Corporation
| Atari Corporation
| 1988
| NA, PAL
|-
! style="text-align: left;"| Donkey Kong Jr.
| Platform
| International Technology Development Corporation
| Atari Corporation
| 1988
| NA, PAL
|-
! style="text-align: left;"| Double Dragon
| Beat 'em up
| Imagineering
| Activision
| 1989
| NA, PAL
|-
! id="F" style="text-align: left;"| F-18 Hornet
| Combat flight simulation
| Imagineering
| Absolute Entertainment
| 1988
| NA, PAL
|-
! style="text-align: left;"| Fatal Run
| Racing
| Sculptured Software
| Atari Corporation
| 1990
| NA, PAL
|-
! style="text-align: left;"| Fight Night
| Sports
| Imagineering
| Atari Corporation
| 1988
| NA, PAL
|-
! style="text-align: left;"| Food Fight
| Action
| General Computer Corporation
| Atari Corporation
| 1987
| NA, PAL
|-
! id="G" style="text-align: left;"| Galaga
| Shoot 'em up
| Atari Corporation
| Atari Corporation
| 1986
| NA, PAL
|-
! id="H" style="text-align: left;"| Hat Trick
| Sports
| Ibid Inc. Software
| Atari Corporation
| 1987
| NA, PAL
|-
! id="I" style="text-align: left;"| Ikari Warriors
| Run and gun
| Imagineering
| Atari Corporation
| 1990
| NA, PAL
|-
! style="text-align: left;"| Impossible Mission
| Platform
| Computer Magic, Ltd.
| Atari Corporation
| 1987
| NA, PAL
|-
! id="J" style="text-align: left;"| Jinks
| Action
| Diamond Software
| Atari Corporation
| 1989
| NA, PAL
|-
! style="text-align: left;"| Joust
| Action
| General Computer Corporation
| Atari Corporation
| 1987
| NA, PAL
|-
! id="K" style="text-align: left;"| Karateka
| Fighting
| Ibid Inc. Software
| Atari Corporation
| 1988
| NA, PAL
|-
! style="text-align: left;"| Kung-Fu Master
| Beat 'em up
| Imagineering Inc.
| Absolute Entertainment
| 1989
| NA, PAL
|-
! id="M" style="text-align: left;"| Mario Bros.
| Platform
| International Technology Development Corporation
| Atari Corporation
| 1988
| NA, PAL
|-
! style="text-align: left;"| Mat Mania Challenge
| Sports
| BlueSky Software
| Atari Corporation
| 1990
| NA, PAL
|-
! style="text-align: left;"| Mean 18 Ultimate Golf
| Sports
| BlueSky Software
| Atari Corporation
| 1989
| NA, PAL
|-
! style="text-align: left;"| Meltdown
| Light gun shooter
| Atari Corporation
| Atari Corporation
| 1990
| NA, PAL
|-
! style="text-align: left;"| Midnight Mutants
| Action-adventure
| Radioactive Software
| Atari Corporation
| 1990
| NA, PAL
|-
! style="text-align: left;"| Motor Psycho
| Racing
| BlueSky Software
| Atari Corporation
| 1990
| NA, PAL
|-
! style="text-align: left;"| Ms. Pac-Man
| Maze
| General Computer Corporation
| Atari Corporation
| 1986
| NA, PAL
|-
! id="N" style="text-align: left;"| Ninja Golf
| Beat 'em up
| BlueSky Software
| Atari Corporation
| 1990
| NA, PAL
|-
! id="O" style="text-align: left;"| One-on-One Basketball
| Sports
| Computer Magic, Ltd.
| Atari Corporation
| 1987
| NA, PAL
|-
! id="P" style="text-align: left;"| Pete Rose Baseball
| Sports
| Imagineering
| Absolute Entertainment
| 1989
| NA, PAL
|-
! style="text-align: left;"| Planet Smashers
| Shoot 'em up
| Atari Corporation
| Atari Corporation
| 1989
| NA, PAL
|-
! style="text-align: left;"| Pole Position II
| Racing
| General Computer Corporation
| Atari Corporation
| 1986
| NA, PAL
|-
! id="R" style="text-align: left;"| Rampage
| Action
| Spectral Dimensions
| Activision
| 1988
| NA
|-
! style="text-align: left;"| RealSports Baseball
| Sports
| Atari Corporation
| Atari Corporation
| 1988
| NA
|-
! style="text-align: left;"| Robotron: 2084
| Shooter
| General Computer Corporation
| Atari Corporation
| 1987
| NA
|-
! id="S" style="text-align: left;"| Scrapyard Dog
| Platform
| BlueSky Software
| Atari Corporation
| 1990
| NA, PAL
|-
! style="text-align: left;"| Sentinel
| Light gun shooter
| Imagineering
| Atari Corporation
| 1991
| PAL
|-
! style="text-align: left;"| Summer Games
| Sports
| Computer Magic, Ltd.
| Atari Corporation
| 1987
| NA
|-
! style="text-align: left;"| Super Huey UH-IX
| Combat flight simulation
| Cosmi Corporation
| Atari Corporation
| 1988
| NA, PAL
|-
! style="text-align: left;"| ''Super Skateboardin| Sports
| Imagineering
| Absolute Entertainment
| 1988
| NA, PAL
|-
! id="T" style="text-align: left;"| Tank Command
| Shooter
| Froggo
| Froggo
| 1988
| NA
|-
! style="text-align: left;"| Title Match Pro Wrestling
| Sports
| Imagineering
| Absolute Entertainment
| 1989
| NA, PAL
|-
! style="text-align: left;"| Tomcat: The F-14 Fighter Simulator
| Combat flight simulation
| Imagineering
| Absolute Entertainment
| 1989
| NA, PAL
|-
! style="text-align: left;"| Touchdown Football
| Sports
| Imagineering
| Atari Corporation
| 1988
| NA
|-
! style="text-align: left;"| Tower Toppler
| Platform
| Atari Corporation
| Atari Corporation
| 1988
| NA, PAL
|-
! id="W" style="text-align: left;"| Water Ski
| Racing
| Froggo
| Froggo
| 1988
| NA
|-
! style="text-align: left;"| Winter Games
| Sports
| Computer Magic, Ltd.
| Atari Corporation
| 1987
| NA, PAL
|-
! id="X" style="text-align: left;"| Xenophobe
| Run and gun
| BlueSky Software
| Atari Corporation
| 1989
| NA, PAL
|-
! style="text-align: left;"| Xevious
| Shoot 'em up
| Atari Corporation
| Atari Corporation
| 1986
| NA, PAL
|}

 Unlicensed games 
There are currently ''' unlicensed games on this list.

Cancelled games

See also 
 List of Atari 2600 games
 Lists of video games

Notes

References

External links 
 List of Atari 7800 games at MobyGames

Atari 7800